The Billboard Latin Music Award for Top Latin Album of the Year is an honor presented annually at the Billboard Latin Music Awards, a ceremony which honors "the most popular albums, songs, and performers in Latin music, as determined by the actual sales, radio airplay, online streaming and social data that informs Billboards weekly charts." The award is given to the best performing albums on Billboards Top Latin Albums chart, which measures the most popular Spanish-language recordings in the United States based on a multi-metric system that blends sales and album-equivalent units. The list was established by the magazine on July 10, 1993 and was originally based on album sales until February 11, 2017. From 1994 to 2007, each music genre's field (pop, tropical, Regional Mexican, jazz, rap, and reggaeton) had their own Album of the Year category, separated between male, female, and duo or group categories.

Enrique Iglesias, Juan Gabriel, and Romeo Santos are the most awarded acts in the category with two wins each. Jenni Rivera is the most nominated artist, with four, all of them after her death. Jenni Rivera, Juan Gabriel, and Ozuna are the only acts with two nominated albums in the same year, a milestone achieved twice by Rivera. Only Juan Gabriel has won Top Latin Album of the Year twice in a row. As of 2019, the holder is Ozuna for the album Odisea.

Recipients

Records

Most nominations

Most awards

See also
Billboard Music Award for Top Latin Album
Latin Grammy Award for Album of the Year

References

Awards established in 2008
Billboard Latin Music Awards
2008 establishments in the United States
Album awards